Matey may refer to:

 Matey Kaziyski (born 1984), Bulgarian volleyball player
 Matey Mateev (1940–2010), Bulgarian theoretical physicist
 Matey Preobrazhenski (1828–1875), clerical name of Mono Petrov Seizmonov, Bulgarian Orthodox priest and revolutionary
 Yumsem Matey, Indian politician elected in 2009
 Malcolm "Matey" McDuck, a Disney character who is an ancestor of Scrooge McDuck and Donald Duck
 Matey, a brand of children's bubble bath marketed by Unilever

See also
 Maty (disambiguation)
 Metis (disambiguation), pronounced the same way
 M80 (disambiguation)

Bulgarian masculine given names